The 2018 Houston Dynamo season was the club's 13th season of existence since joining Major League Soccer in the 2006 season. The club entered the campaign coming off its 7th Conference Final appearance in 13 years, the most among any MLS team in that time span. It was the team's second year under the leadership of Head Coach Wilmer Cabrera and fourth season under General Manager Matt Jordan. On the front office end, it was Gabriel Brener's third season as majority owner and Chris Canetti's eighth as the President of Business Operations.

The Dynamo failed to make the MLS Cup Playoffs for the fourth time in five years but reached success in cup play, lifting its first U.S. Open Cup title - earning qualification to the 2019 CONCACAF Champions League.

Season Overview

Preseason

Roster

Player movement

In 
Per Major League Soccer and club policies terms of the deals do not get disclosed.

Out

Loans 
Per Major League Soccer and club policies terms of the deals do not get disclosed.

In

Coaching staff

Competitions

Major League Soccer

Matches 

League Tables

Western Conference

Overall

U.S. Open Cup

Player Statistics

Appearances, goals, and assists 
As of October 29, 2018
{| class="wikitable sortable" style="text-align:center;"
|+
! rowspan="2" |No.
! rowspan="2" |Pos
! rowspan="2" |Nat
! rowspan="2" |
! colspan="3" |
! colspan="3" |
! colspan="3" |
|-
!
!
!
!
!
!
!
!
!
|-
|1||GK||||align=left|||2||0||0||2||0||0||0||0||0
|-
|2||DF||||align=left|||26||3||1||22||3||1||4||0||0
|-
|3||DF||||align=left|||23||0||0||21||0||0||2||0||0
|-
|4||DF||||align=left|||13||4||1||8||4||1||5||0||0
|-
|5||MF||||align=left|||7||0||0||6||0||0||1||0||0
|-
|6||MF||||align=left|||23||1||2||21||1||2||2||0||0
|-
|7||DF||||align=left|||28||1||2||26||1||2||2||0||0
|-
|8||MF||||align=left|||24||4||1||19||1||0||5||3||1
|-
|9||FW||||align=left|||37||25||1||33||19||1||4||6||0
|-
|10||MF||||align=left|||36||5||14||32||5||13||4||0||1
|-
|11||MF||||align=left|||24||3||1||22||2||1||2||1||0
|-
|12||MF||||align=left|||20||0||3||18||0||1||2||0||2
|-
|13||MF||||align=left|||15||0||1||12||0||0||3||0||1
|-
|14||DF||||align=left|||18||0||3||16||0||1||2||0||2
|-
|14||MF||||align=left|||0||0||0||0||0||0||0||0||0
|-
|15||DF||||align=left|||0||0||0||0||0||0||0||0||0
|-
|16||DF||||align=left|||19||1||0||15||1||0||4||0||0
|-
|17||FW||||align=left|||34||11||13||30||11||10||4||0||3
|-
|18||GK||||align=left|||9||0||0||6||0||0||3||0||0
|-
|19||FW||||align=left|||3||0||0||3||0||0||0||0||0
|-
|20||DF||||align=left|||4||0||0||4||0||0||0||0||0
|-
|21||FW||||align=left|||9||1||0||9||1||0||0||0||0
|-
|21||DF||||align=left|||0||0||0||0||0||0||0||0||0
|-
|22||MF||||align=left|||25||1||0||24||1||0||1||0||0
|-
|23||GK||||align=left|||28||0||0||26||0||0||2||0||0
|-
|24||MF||||align=left|||27||1||1||24||1||0||3||0||1
|-
|25||MF||||align=left|||8||0||0||6||0||0||2||0||0
|-
|26||GK||||align=left|||0||0||0||0||0||0||0||0||0
|-
|27||MF||||align=left|||32||1||7||29||1||7||3||0||0
|-
|30||DF||||align=left|||1||0||0||0||0||0||1||0||0
|-
|31||MF||||align=left|||36||8||12||32||6||12||4||2||0
|-
|33||DF||||align=left|||7||0||1||0||7||0||1||0||0
|-
|35||MF||||align=left|||1||0||0||0||0||0||1||0||0
|-
|37||FW||||align=left|||1||1||0||0||0||0||1||1||0
|-
|38||FW||||align=left|||1||2||0||0||0||0||1||2||0
|-
|39||MF||||align=left|||1||0||0||0||0||0||1||0||0
|-
|40||FW||||align=left|||1||0||0||0||0||0||1||0||0

Disciplinary Record 
As of October 29, 2018
{| class="wikitable sortable" style="text-align:center;"
|+
! rowspan="2" |No.
! rowspan="2" |Pos
! rowspan="2" |Nat
! rowspan="2" |
! colspan="2" |
! colspan="2" |
! colspan="2" |
|-
!style="width:30px;"|
!style="width:30px;"|
!style="width:30px;"|
!style="width:30px;"|
!style="width:30px;"|
!style="width:30px;"|
|-
|1||GK||||align=left|||1||0||1||0||0||0
|-
|2||DF||||align=left|||9||1||7||1||2||0
|-
|3||DF||||align=left|||3||0||3||0||0||0
|-
|4||DF||||align=left|||3||0||2||0||1||0
|-
|5||MF||||align=left|||1||0||1||0||0||0
|-
|6||MF||||align=left|||3||1||3||1||0||0
|-
|7||DF||||align=left|||0||1||0||1||0||0
|-
|8||MF||||align=left|||1||0||1||0||0||0
|-
|9||FW||||align=left|||2||0||1||0||1||0
|-
|10||MF||||align=left|||7||1||5||1||2||0
|-
|11||MF||||align=left|||1||0||1||0||0||0
|-
|12||MF||||align=left|||1||0||1||0||0||0
|-
|13||MF||||align=left|||1||0||1||0||0||0
|-
|14||DF||||align=left|||4||0||4||0||0||0
|-
|14||MF||||align=left|||0||0||0||0||0||0
|-
|15||DF||||align=left|||0||0||0||0||0||0
|-
|16||DF||||align=left|||0||0||0||0||0||0
|-
|17||FW||||align=left|||7||1||6||1||1||0
|-
|18||GK||||align=left|||2||0||1||0||1||0
|-
|19||FW||||align=left|||0||0||0||0||0||0
|-
|20||DF||||align=left|||0||0||0||0||0||0
|-
|21||FW||||align=left|||2||1||2||1||0||0
|-
|21||DF||||align=left|||0||0||0||0||0||0
|-
|22||MF||||align=left|||4||0||4||0||0||0
|-
|23||GK||||align=left|||3||0||3||0||0||0
|-
|24||MF||||align=left|||10||1||9||1||1||0
|-
|25||MF||||align=left|||0||0||0||0||0||0
|-
|26||GK||||align=left|||0||0||0||0||0||0
|-
|27||MF||||align=left|||9||0||7||0||2||0
|-
|30||DF||||align=left|||0||0||0||0||0||0
|-
|31||MF||||align=left|||4||0||3||0||1||0
|-
|33||DF||||align=left|||1||0||1||0||0||0
|-
|35||MF||||align=left|||0||0||0||0||0||0
|-
|37||FW||||align=left|||0||0||0||0||0||0
|-
|38||FW||||align=left|||0||0||0||0||0||0
|-
|39||MF||||align=left|||1||0||0||0||1||0
|-
|40||FW||||align=left|||0||0||0||0||0||0

References 

Houston Dynamo FC seasons
Houston Dynamo
Houston Dynamo
Houston Dynamo
2018